Hallaren is a surname. Notable people with the surname include:

 Jane Hallaren (born 1940), American actress
 Mary Hallaren (1907–2005), director of the U.S. Women's Army Corps